Elmalı is a village in the Vezirköprü district, Samsun Province, Turkey.

References

Villages in Vezirköprü District